Roger Erickson may refer to:

 Roger Erickson (baseball) (born 1956), retired baseball pitcher
 Roger Erickson (photographer), American photographer
 Roger Erickson (politician) (born 1953), Minnesota politician